The 1964 All-Ireland Junior Hurling Championship was the 43rd staging of the All-Ireland Junior Championship since its establishment by the Gaelic Athletic Association in 1912.

Kerry entered the championship as the defending champions, however, they were beaten by Cork in the Munster semi-final.

The All-Ireland final was played on 18 October 1964 at the Athletic Grounds in Cork, between Cork and London, in what was their first ever meeting in the final. Cork won the match by 1–08 to 2–04 to claim their fourth championship title overall and a first tile in nine years.

Results

All-Ireland Junior Football Championship

All-Ireland semi-finals

All-Ireland home final

All-Ireland final

References

Junior
All-Ireland Junior Football Championship